Protoculture may refer to:

 Protoculture, the passing of learned behaviors from one generation to another in non-human primates
 A term used in the science fiction anime series The Super Dimension Fortress Macross, but referring to different things depending on the version:
 In Macross: an ancient race of  alien humanoids
 In the American adaptation, Robotech: an ancient power source and foodstuff
 Protoculture Addicts, a North American anime and manga magazine
Protoculture Inc., publisher of the magazine
 "Proto Culture", a hip-hop song about video games, by artist Del tha Funkee Homosapien (featuring Khaos Unique), on the album Both Sides of the Brain